Philip of the Palatinate (5 July 1480 in Heidelberg – 5 January 1541 in Freising) was Prince-Bishop of Freising (1498–1541) and Naumburg (1517–1541).  He was a member of the house of Wittelsbach, and the son of Elector Palatine Philip the Upright and Margaret of Bavaria.  Among 14 children, he was the second oldest son.  Several contemporary portraits of him are known.

Bishop of Freising 
Philip defended the diocese of Freising successfully in the turmoil of the German Peasants' War.  He managed to keep the Bavarian dukes out of the policy of the bishopric.  He initiated many construction projects and is buried in the Freising Cathedral.

Bishop of Naumburg 
In 1512, he was appointed Coadjutor of bishop John III of Naumburg.  After John died, Philip was appointed Bishop of Naumburg as well.  He stayed in Naumburg for ten months.  After that, his primary residence was again in Freising, while Naumburg was mostly ruled by administrators.  As he enjoyed the good will of the House of Wettin, he took a moderate attitude towards Martin Luther.  After the death of Frederick III and the emerging resistance of the Naumburg and Zeitz citizenship, Philip moved to the Catholic camp and paid no more visits to Naumburg.  He was tired of ruling and tried to find a successor to the bishopric of Naumburg.

References 

 Heinz Wießner: Das Bistum Naumburg 1 - Die Diözese 2, in: Max-Planck-Institut für Geschichte (ed.): Germania Sacra, NF 35.2, Die Bistumer der Kirchenprovinz Magdeburg, Berlin/New York, 1998. pp. 951–965.

House of Wittelsbach
Roman Catholic Prince-Bishops of Freising
1480 births
1541 deaths
Sons of monarchs